The second government of Hussein Arnous was formed after appointment by the President of Syria on 10 August 2021 and took the oath of office on 14 August 2021, after the presidential election held in May. This replaced the caretaker ministry formed in July. The government is the 95th since Syria gained independence from the Ottoman Empire in 1918 and is the eighth during the presidency of Bashar al-Assad.

Ministers 

 Hussein Arnous, Prime Minister of Syria
 Ali Abdullah Ayyoub, Deputy Prime Minister of Syria
 Ali Mahmoud Abbas, Minister of Defense
 Faisal Mekdad, Foreign Affairs and Expatriates Minister
 Mohammad Khaled al-Rahmoun, Interior Minister
 Ahmad al-Sayyed, Justice Minister
 Kenan Yaghi, Finance Minister
 Mohammad Samer al-Khalil, Economy and Foreign Trade Minister	
 Amr Salem, Internal Trade and Consumer Protection Minister	
 Ziyad Sabbagh, Industry Minister
 Zouhair Khazim, Transport Minister
 Tammam Raad, Water Resources Minister
 Bassam Tohme, Minister of Oil and Mineral Reserves
 Ghassan al-Zamel, Electricity Minister
 Iyad Mohammad al-Khatib, Communications and Technology Minister
 Mohamed Seif El-Din, Minister of Social Affairs and Labor
 Suhail Mohammad Abdullatif, Public Works and Housing Minister	
 Mohammed Hassan Qatana, Agriculture and Agrarian Reform Minister
 Hussein Makhlouf, Local Administration and Environment Minister
 Boutros Al-Hallaq, Information Minister
 Mohammad Abdul-Sattar al-Sayyed, Awqaf (Religious Endowments) Minister
 Hassan al-Ghabbash, Health Minister
 Darem Tabbaa, Education Minister	
 Bassam Bashir Ibrahim, Higher Education Minister	
 Lubanah Mshaweh, Minister of Culture
 Mohammad Rami Radwan Martini, Tourism Minister
 Salam Mohammad al-Saffaf, Administrative Development Minister
 Mansour Fadlallah Azzam, Presidential Affairs Minister
 Mohammad Fayez al-Barasha, Minister of State for Investment Affairs and Vital Projects
 Abdullah Sallum Abdullah, Minister of State for People's Assembly Affairs
 Diala Barakat, Minister of State for Southern Development Affairs

Ministerial changes
On 28 April 2022, Presidential Decree No. 115 was issued naming Major General Ali Mahmoud Abbas as Minister of Defense replacing Ali Abdullah Ayyoub.

See also 
 Cabinet of Syria
 Government ministries of Syria
 Politics of Syria
 Political parties in Syria

Notes

References

External links
Official Gov Page

Bashar al-Assad
2021 establishments in Syria
Cabinets established in 2021
Governments of Syria
Arnous
2020s in Syrian politics